Carey Park is a hamlet-estate in Cornwall, England, UK.

References

Hamlets in Cornwall
Polperro